Madan Mahal - Singrauli Intercity Express is an intercity train of the Indian Railways connecting  of Jabalpur in Madhya Pradesh and Singrauli of Madhya Pradesh. It is currently being operated with Madhya Pradesh train numbers on a daily basis.

Till Nov 2019, It was Ran as Jabalpur Singarauli Intercity Express.

Service

The 11651/Madan Mahal - Singrauli Intercity Express has an average speed of 51 km/hr and covers 349 km in 6 hrs 50 mins. 11652/Singrauli - Madan Mahal Intercity Express has an average speed of 52 km/hr and covers 349 km in 6 hrs 45 mins.

Route and halts 

The important halts of the train are:

Coach composite

The train has standard ICF rakes with max speed of 110 kmph. The train consists of 15 coaches :

 1 AC III Tier Chair Car
 10 Chair Car
 2 General
 2 Second-class Luggage/parcel van

Traction

Both trains are hauled by a Katni Loco Shed based WDM 3A diesel locomotive from Jabalpur to Singrauli and vice versa.

Notes

References

External links 

 11651/Jabalpur - Singrauli InterCity Express
 11652/Singrauli - Jabalpur InterCity Express

Rail transport in Madhya Pradesh
Transport in Jabalpur
Railway services introduced in 2012
Intercity Express (Indian Railways) trains